The Alliance for Open Media (AOMedia) is a non-profit industry consortium that develops open, royalty-free technology for multimedia delivery headquartered in Wakefield, Massachusetts. It uses the ideas and principles of open web standard development to create video standards that can serve as royalty-free alternatives to the hitherto dominant standards of the Moving Picture Experts Group (MPEG) and its related business model of exploiting intellectual property through patent royalties associated with patent and licensing complications and fees.

Its first project was to develop AV1, a new open video codec and format, as a successor to VP9 and a royalty-free alternative to HEVC. AV1 uses elements from Daala, Thor, and VP10, three preceding open video codecs.

The governing members of the Alliance for Open Media are Amazon, Apple, ARM, Cisco, Facebook, Google, Huawei, Intel, Microsoft, Mozilla, Netflix, Nvidia, Samsung Electronics and Tencent.

History
Some collaboration and work that would later be merged into AV1 predates the official launch of the Alliance.
Following the successful standardization of an audio standard in the Internet Engineering Task Force (IETF) in 2012, a working group for the standardization of a royalty-free video format began to form under the lead of members of the Xiph.org Foundation, who had begun working on their experimental video format Daala back in 2010.
In May 2015, the Internet Video Codec working group (NetVC) of the IETF was officially started and presented with coding techniques from Xiph's/Mozilla's Daala. Cisco Systems joined forces and offered their own prototype format Thor to the working group on July 22.

The lack of a suitable video format for inclusion in the World Wide Web Consortium (W3C)'s HTML5 specification and the failed negotiations for one mandatory video format for WebRTC showed the need for a competitive, open video standard.
The emergence of a second patent pool for HEVC (HEVC Advance) in spring 2015 provided motivation for investments in an alternative video format and grew support for the Alliance, mainly due to the uncertainty regarding royalties for MPEG's next-generation video format, HEVC.

On September 1, 2015, the Alliance for Open Media was announced with the goal of developing a royalty free video format as an alternative to licensed formats such as H.264 and HEVC. The founding members are Amazon, Cisco, Google, Intel, Microsoft, Mozilla, and Netflix. The plan was to release the video format by 2017.

The alliance saw expansion of its member list since inception. On April 5, 2016, the Alliance for Open Media announced that AMD, ARM, and Nvidia had joined, and Adobe, Ateme, Ittiam and Vidyo joined in the months following. On November 13, 2017, Facebook later joined as a governing member. In January 2018 the alliance's website was quietly updated to add Apple as a governing member of the alliance. On April 3, 2019, Samsung Electronics joined as a governing member. October 1, 2019, Tencent joined as a governing member.

In 2018, the founder and chairman of the MPEG acknowledged the Alliance to be the biggest threat to their business model, furthermore stating that:

AOMedia Video

The Alliance for Open Media (AOMedia)'s first project was the creation of an open video compression format and codec optimized for streaming media over the internet, intended for both commercial and non-commercial content, including user-generated content. The format is intended to be the first in a line of new, AOMedia Video (AV) formats being developed.

AOMedia planned for the first version of its format (AV1) to be completed before the end of 2017. However, work on the bitstream specification will be continued into 2018. The format is the primary contender for standardisation by the video coding standard working group NetVC of the Internet Engineering Task Force (IETF).

The main distinguishing features of AV1 are its royalty-free licensing terms and state of the art performance. AV1 is specifically designed for real-time applications and for higher resolutions than typical usage scenarios of the current generation (H.264) of video formats.

Operation and structure
The Alliance is incorporated in the US as a tax-exempt non-profit organization and a subsidiary "project" of the independent Joint Development Foundation (JDF), also headquartered in Wakefield.

The Alliance will release new video codecs as free software under the BSD 2-Clause License. It adopted the patent rules of the W3C which mandate technology contributors to disclose all patents that may be relevant and to agree to a royalty-free patent license. The Alliance's patent license contains a defensive termination clause to discourage patent lawsuits.

Software development happens in the open using a public source code repository and issue tracking system, and welcomes contributions from the general public. Contributions have to pass internal reviews and gain consensus for their adoption. Different sub-groups inside the Alliance handle testing, reviews for IPR/patent problems hardware-friendliness, and editing of specification documents.

There are two levels of membership: organizations can join as an ordinary member, or as a governing member with a seat on the board of directors. Confusingly, these are dubbed "founding members" in AOM terminology, although they need not be members since the Alliance was founded.

There is a broad representation of the video industry among the Alliance members, featuring several hardware, software, and content producers, OTT video distributors, providers of real-time conferencing solutions, and browser vendors. Several AOM members have previously worked on MPEG's HEVC and hold patents to it (e.g. BBC, Intel, Cisco, Vidyo, Apple, Microsoft, and Broadcom).

Governing members
As of November 2021:

General members
As of November 2021:

Previous members
 IBM (previously a Founding/Governing member, but delisted from website as of July 7, 2020)

References

External links
 

Free and open-source software organizations